Glenluce Abbey, near to Glenluce, Scotland, was a Cistercian monastery called also Abbey of Luce or Vallis Lucis  and founded around 1190 by Rolland or Lochlann, Lord of Galloway and Constable of Scotland. Following the Scottish Reformation in 1560, the abbey fell into disuse.

Ballinclach
On 23 January 1497, James IV erected "Ballinclach in Glenluce" into a burgh of barony in favour of the abbey, although there is no record of the burgh operating.

Glenluce and the Kennedy family 

In 1560, after the Scottish Reformation, John Gordon of Lochinvar took possession of Glenluce Abbey. His servant Cuthbert Kirkpatrick refused entry to the abbot, Thomas Hay. Lochinvar removed himself and his servants in November 1561, and gave the key to Gilbert Kennedy, 4th Earl of Cassilis.

Gilbert Kennedy, 4th Earl of Cassilis persuaded one of the monks of the abbey to counterfeit the necessary signatures to a deed conveying the lands of the abbey to him and his heirs. To ensure that the forgery was not discovered he employed a man to murder the monk and then persuaded his uncle, the laird of Bargany, to hang his paid assassin on a trumped up charge of theft. The success of these actions encouraged him to obtain the lands of Crossraguel Abbey through the torturing of Allan Stewart, the commendator at his castle of Dunure.

In March 1587 the king's tutor Peter Young tried to find manuscripts of Caesar's Commentary and a Greek "Hegisippus" that the last Abbot of Glenluce had promised to him.

The ruins were consolidated and partly restored in 1898 by the Glasgow architect, Peter MacGregor Chalmers. They are a scheduled ancient monument.

See also

 Abbot of Glenluce, for a list of abbots and commendators
 Scheduled monuments in Dumfries and Galloway

References

External links 
 Historic Environment Scotland: Visitor guide
 Undiscovered Scotland: Glenluce Abbey
 Abbey Portal
 The Gazetteer of Scotland by Robert Chambers. VOL.II The gazetteer of Scotland, With plates and maps

Cistercian monasteries in Scotland
History of Galloway
Christianity in Dumfries and Galloway
Christian monasteries established in the 12th century
1602 disestablishments in Europe
Historic Scotland properties in Dumfries and Galloway
Ruined abbeys and monasteries
Ruins in Dumfries and Galloway
1192 establishments in Scotland
Scheduled Ancient Monuments in Dumfries and Galloway
Former Christian monasteries in Scotland